Richard Rose Morton Academy (formerly Morton School) is a coeducational secondary school with academy status, located in the Morton area of Carlisle, Cumbria, England.

The school converted to academy status on 1 September 2008, and is in a federation with Richard Rose Central Academy, part of United Learning.

External links 
Richard Rose Morton Academy website

Secondary schools in Cumbria
Academies in Cumbria
United Learning schools